The following three lists of generic and genericized trademarks are:
 marks which were originally legally protected trademarks, but have been genericized and have lost their legal status due to becoming generic terms,
 marks which have been abandoned and are now generic terms
 marks which are still legally protected as trademarks, at least in some jurisdictions

List of former trademarks that have been genericized 
The following partial list contains marks which were originally legally protected trademarks, but which have subsequently lost legal protection as trademarks by becoming the common name of the relevant product or service, as used both by the consuming public and commercial competitors. These marks were determined in court to have become generic. Some marks retain trademark protection in certain countries despite being declared generic in others.

 Aspirin Still a Bayer trademark name for acetylsalicylic acid in about 80 countries, including Canada and many countries in Europe, but declared generic in the U.S.
 Catseye Originally a trademark for a specific type of retroreflective road safety installation.
 CellophaneStill a registered trademark of Innovia Films Ltd in Europe and many other jurisdictions. Genericized in the U.S. Originally a trademark of DuPont. A thin, transparent sheet made of regenerated cellulose.
 Dry iceTrademarked by the Dry Ice Corporation of America in 1925. A solid form of carbon dioxide.
 EscalatorOriginally a trademark of Otis Elevator Company and it was a registered trademark until 1950.
 Flip phone Originally a trademark of Motorola.
 Flit gun Originally trademarked as a dispenser for Flit, a brand of insecticide manufactured by the Standard Oil Company of New Jersey (later Exxon).
 Heroin Trademarked by Friedrich Bayer & Co in 1898. Trademark lost in some nations in the Treaty of Versailles, in 1919.
 Hovercraft Trademarked by Saunders-Roe.
 KeroseneFirst used around 1852.
 Lanolin Trademarked as the term for a preparation of water and the wax from sheep's wool.
 Launderette Coin laundry shop. Telecoin-Bendix trademark, for coin laundries of Telecoin-adapted Bendix machines.
 Laundromat Coin laundry shop. Westinghouse trademark, registered in the U.S. in the 1940s (automatic washing machine) and 1950s (coin laundry) but now expired.
 Linoleum Floor covering, originally coined by Frederick Walton in 1864, and ruled as generic following a lawsuit for trademark infringement in 1878; probably the first product name to become a generic term.

 Mimeograph Originally trademarked by Albert Dick. A low-cost printing press that works by forcing ink through a stencil onto paper.
 Quonset A trademark of the Great Lakes Steel Corporation for a brand of hemicylindrical prefabricated structures, first deployed at Quonset Point, Rhode Island
 SellotapeSellotape is a British brand of transparent, cellulose-based, pressure-sensitive adhesive tape, and is the leading brand in the United Kingdom. Sellotape is generally used for joining, sealing, attaching and mending. The term has become a genericised trademark in the UK, Ireland, Australia, Nigeria, Ghana, New Zealand, Israel, India, Serbia, Japan, Croatia, Greece, Turkey, Malaysia, Macedonia, Zimbabwe, and South Africa, and is used much in the same way that Scotch Tape came to be used in Canada, France, Italy and the United States, in referring to any brand of clear adhesive tape.
 Spidola A brand created by the Latvian manufacturer VEF, but widely used in Russian to refer to all transistor radios.
 Teleprompter The word TelePrompTer, with internal capitalization, originated in the 1950s as a trade name used by the TelePrompTer Corporation, for their television prompting apparatus.
Trampoline Originally a trademark of the Griswold-Nissen Trampoline & Tumbling Company.
 Videotape Originally trademarked by Ampex Corporation, an early manufacturer of audio and video tape recorders.

List of former trademarks that have since become generic terms due to reasons other than genericization
The following partial list contains marks which were originally legally protected trademarks, but which have subsequently lost legal protection as trademarks due to abandonment, non-renewal or improper issuance (the generic term predated the registration). Some marks retain trademark protection in certain countries despite being generic in others.

 App Store Trademark claimed by Apple Inc. for their digital distribution platform. Apple filed a lawsuit against Amazon.com over Appstore for Amazon, but abandoned the lawsuit after an early rejection of Apple's false advertising claim in the lawsuit. As part of the settlement, Apple gave Amazon a covenant not to sue, so that Amazon would drop its counterclaim to have the registration cancelled.  the trademark, reg. no. 4,829,304, remains "Issued and Active" at the U.S. Patent and Trademark Office.
 Dumpster Trademark was cancelled in 2015. Trademarked by Dempster Brothers, Inc. in 1963, dumpster is originally a portmanteau of the word dump and the last name Dempster. It originally appeared in the 1951 product name Dempster Dumpster, while related patents date back to 1937.
 Multiball Used to refer to a state on a pinball machine where two or more balls are present on the playfield simultaneously and can be accessed by the flippers. Trademarked by WMS Industries in 1981 as "Multi-ball" and by Templar Studios in 2000 as "Multiball." "Multiball" was abandoned as a trademark in 2001, and "Multi-ball" was canceled in 2002.
 Touch-tone Dual tone multi-frequency telephone signaling; AT&T states "formerly a trademark of AT&T".
 Webster's Dictionary The publishers with the strongest link to the original are Merriam-Webster, but they have a trademark only on "Merriam-Webster", and other dictionaries are legally published as "Webster's Dictionary".
 Yo-Yo Still a Papa's Toy Co. Ltd. trademark name for a spinning toy in Canada, but was determined that the trademark was improperly issued.
 ZIP code Originally registered as a service mark but has since expired.
 Zipper Originally a trademark of B.F. Goodrich for use in rubber boots.

List of protected trademarks frequently used as generic terms
Marks in this partial list are still legally protected as trademarks, at least in some jurisdictions, but are sometimes used by consumers in a generic sense. Unlike the names in the list above, these names are still widely known by the public as brand names, and are not used by competitors. Scholars disagree as to whether the use of a recognized trademark name for similar products can truly be called "generic", or if it is instead a form of synecdoche.

The previous list contains trademarks that have completely lost their legal status in some countries, while the following list contains marks which have been registered as trademarks, continue in use, and are actively enforced by their trademark owners. Writing guides such as the AP Stylebook advise writers to "use a generic equivalent unless the trademark is essential to the story".

External links
genericides.org used to keep a list of generic trademarks. Most entries included links to use in newspapers

References

Lists of trademarks